Cheryl Koh, known professionally as Cheryl K (born 24 November 1995) is a Malaysian singer-songwriter and actress. She was most known for her performance on the Warner Bros. Pictures 2018 film, Crazy Rich Asians. Cheryl sings the film's opening title and ending credits song, "Money (That's What I Want)" in both English and Mandarin Chinese. The ending credits version also has Awkwafina, who stars in the film as Peik Lin, rapping on the song. Cheryl was discovered by the film's director Jon M. Chu who saw her singing a 15-second a cappella cover of Jessie J's "Mamma Knows Best" on YouTube and offered her the job.

Early life 
Cheryl was born on 24 November 1995 in Kuala Lumpur, Malaysia. She started singing at the age of 8.

In May 2018, she graduated with a Bachelor's in Business Administration from USC Marshall School of Business and a Music Industry minor from USC Thornton School of Music at the University of Southern California in Los Angeles, California.

Career 
In 2010, Cheryl represented Malaysia in the World Championships of Performing Arts (WCOPA) in Hollywood and won four Gold medals including a Hollywood Industry Award and Champion of the World Senior Division Awards. She was then invited again to perform as the opening guest artist for the competition's 23rd Annual WCOPA Grand Finale at the Terrace Theatre in Long Beach, California where it was webcast live globally.

Prior to her move to Los Angeles, Cheryl has shared the stage with other prominent Malaysian artists such as Datuk Seri Siti Nurhaliza, Jaclyn Victor, and Vince Chong.

In 2014, Cheryl was invited to perform alongside producer, composer, and 16x Grammy winner, David Foster. She also shared the stage and sang with American R&B singer-songwriter, Eric Benet and American Idol season 2 Winner, Ruben Studdard.

In 2018, Cheryl made her most notable debut singing a unique version of Barrett Strong's "Money (That's What I Want)" in both English and Mandarin in the Warner Bros. Pictures film, Crazy Rich Asians.

Cheryl has released her new single, "Here to Stay" on 23 December 2018. In an interview, she says the song is "meant to inspire others to persevere against anyone who is trying to take you down." On 19 June 2020, she released another single she wrote entitled, who are you.

Discography
Singles
 "Here to Stay" (2018)
 "Who Are You" (2020)
 "Better" (2020)

Featured
 "Ready2Love feat. Cheryl K" by Guy Tang (2021)

References

External links 
 Official website
 

1995 births
Living people
Malaysian people of Chinese descent
Malaysian Christians
Malaysian actresses
21st-century Malaysian women singers
Malaysian singer-songwriters
21st-century Malaysian actresses
21st-century American actresses
21st-century American women singers
21st-century American singers
University of Southern California alumni
Marshall School of Business alumni
American Idol participants